Gohar Nawaz Khan is a Pakistani politician hailing from Haripur District. He is a advisor of Metrix Tech Summit Pakistan's biggest tech Summit. He had served as a member of the Khyber Pakhtunkhwa Assembly belonging to the Qaumi Watan Party. He had also served as member of several different committees.

Political career
Gohar was elected a member of the Khyber Pakhtunkhwa Assembly, an Independent from PK-51 (Haripur-III) in the 2013 Pakistani general election and later joined the Qaumi Watan Party.

References

Living people
Pashtun people
Khyber Pakhtunkhwa MPAs 2013–2018
People from Haripur District
Qaumi Watan Party politicians
Year of birth missing (living people)